Sol Libsohn (February 5, 1914 - January 21, 2001) was a self-taught, documentary photographer.

Biography 
After graduating from City College of New York, he joined the Film and Photo League where he earned his living documenting paintings. In 1936, he co-founded the Photo League with Sid Grossman. Libsohn was an important teacher at the League as well as a member and leader of numerous production groups.

In addition to freelance work for numerous magazines, he also was employed by Roy Stryker for the documentary project of Standard Oil Company of New Jersey (later Exxon), the Federal Art Project, and Princeton University, where he taught art and photography to disadvantaged youth in the Summer Program.

Libsohn was a personal acquaintance of Romana Javitz, head of The New York Public Library’s Picture Collection from 1929 to 1968, who sought out his work for the Library.

Libsohn died on January 21, 2001, in Princeton, NJ.

Exhibitions
 The Family of Man, Jan 24–May 8, 1955, The Museum of Modern Art, New York
 Image of Freedom, Oct 29, 1941–Feb 1, 1942, The Museum of Modern Art, New York

Collections
 Museum of Modern Art
 International Center for Photography
 Harvard Art Museums
 New York Public Library

References

External links 
 Sol Libsohn (George Eastman House)

20th-century American photographers
1914 births
2001 deaths